The Renault Clio Rally5 is a rally car developed and built by Renault Sport for the Group Rally5 specification of the Rally Pyramid. It is based upon the Renault Clio road car and made its WRC debut at the 2020 Rally Mexico.

Development
Intended to be driven by rally beginners, the Clio Rally5 uses a less powerful engine than the Rally4 variant. Unlike the Clio Rally4, the Rally5 does not feature adjustable shock absorbers. The car also uses slightly narrower tyres at tarmac events than the Rally4 car.

Competition history
The car was used in the Renault Clio Trophy created by Toksport on select events of the 2021 European Rally Championship season, with the winner of the category offered a three-event drive in a Renault Clio Rally4.

References

External links

  
 Renault Clio Rally5 at eWRC-results.com

Clio Rally5
Rally5 cars